Letter to Evan is an album by American pianist David Benoit released in 1992, recorded for the GRP label. The album reached #3 on Billboard's Jazz chart.

Track listing

Personnel 
 David Benoit – acoustic piano (1-11), arrangements and conductor (1-11)
 Peter Sprague – guitar (2, 10)
 Larry Carlton – guitar (3, 4, 9, 11)
 Dori Caymmi – guitar (8)
 John Patitucci – bass (1, 2, 4, 6)
 Steve Bailey – bass (3, 5, 8, 11)
 Charnett Moffett – bass (7)
 Dave Enos – bass (10)
 Peter Erskine – drums (1, 2, 4, 6, 10)
 Terri Lyne Carrington – drums (3, 8, 10), surdo (3, 8, 10), tambourine (3, 8, 10)
 Al Foster – drums (7)
 Luis Conte – percussion (5, 8)
 Michael Fisher – percussion (8), pandeiro (8), whistle (8)
 Jim Walker – flute (3)
 James Thatcher – French horn (5)
 Steve Erdody – cello (3)
 Larry Corbett – cello (5)

Production 
 Producers – David Benoit and Jeffrey Weber 
 Executive Producers – Dave Grusin and Larry Rosen 
 Recorded and Mixed by Allen Sides
 Mastered by Bernie Grundman at Bernie Grundman Mastering (Hollywood, California).
 Music Coordinator – Tim Aller
 Production Coordinator – Michael Pollard
 Art Production – Richard Veloso
 Creative Director – Andy Baltimore 
 Front Cover Art – Reid Philip Weimer
 Graphic Design – Scott Johnson, Sonny Mediana, Andy Ruggirello and Dan Serrano.
 Black and White Photography – Bill Loving 
 Color Photography – Dennis Keeley
 Liner Notes – David Benoit

Charts

References

External links
David Benoit-Letter to Evan at Discogs

1992 albums
David Benoit (musician) albums
GRP Records albums